Phuduhudu is a village in Kgalagadi District of Botswana. It is located in the northeast part of the district, in the Kalahari Desert, and it has a primary school. The population was 482 in the 2011 census.

References

Kgalagadi District
Villages in Botswana